Baltic Sea Philharmonic (formerly Baltic Youth Philharmonic) is an orchestra which consists of musicians from countries around Baltic Sea.

The orchestra's conductor is Kristjan Järvi.

The orchestra was established in 2008 by the initiative of Thomas Hummel.

In 2015, the orchestra was awarded with European Culture Prize by the European Culture Foundation 'Pro Europe'.

In 2016, the orchestra was named to Baltic Sea Philharmonic.

It is an associated member of the European Federation of National Youth Orchestras.

See also 
 List of youth orchestras

References

External links 

Baltic Sea
European youth orchestras